So You Want to Lead a Band is a half-hour television variety show hosted by Sammy Kaye. It was also known as The Sammy Kaye Show, The Sammy Kaye Variety Show, Sammy Kaye's Music from Manhattan, and Music from Manhattan.

Format
Members of the studio audience are invited to conduct the band. Then through its applause, the audience chooses the winning amateur conductor. The winner receives a prize. Vocalists on the program included Barbara Benson and Jeffrey Clay.

The series aired on Thursdays at 9pm Eastern Time after Treasury Men in Action and before Kraft Television Theater. The show's competition on NBC was Dragnet.

In 1954, it was replaced by Star Tonight.

Broadcast schedule

Source: The Complete Directory to Prime Time Network and Cable TV Shows 1946-Present

References

External links
So You Want to Lead a Band at CTVA

1954 American television series debuts
1955 American television series endings
1950s American variety television series
American Broadcasting Company original programming
Black-and-white American television shows